The St. Clair County Transit District (SCCTD) is a transit district that serves fifteen townships in northern St. Clair County, Illinois. Created in 1981 under the authority of the Illinois Mass Transit District Act, it levies a half-cent sales tax to fund MetroLink service in the county, as well as a quarter-cent sales tax which funds MetroBus and paratransit bus service in the member townships. The operation of MetroLink and MetroBus lines is contracted to the Bi-State Development Agency (Metro), while the paratransit service is operated by the Alternative Transportation System (ATS).

Bus routes

Transit hubs
The St. Clair County Transit District has two transit hubs: St. Clair County Transit Plaza and O'Fallon Transit Center.

References

External links
St. Clair County Transit Web site
Official Metro Web site

 
Public transportation in Greater St. Louis
Public transportation in the Metro East
Metro Transit (St. Louis)
Bus transportation in Illinois
MetroBus (St. Louis)
MetroLink (St. Louis)
Intermodal transportation authorities in Illinois